Barry Fredrick Wilcox (born April 23, 1948 in New Westminster, British Columbia) is a Canadian former professional ice hockey player who played in the National Hockey League for the Vancouver Canucks between 1972 and 1975. He also played several years in the minor leagues before retiring in 1975.

Playing career
Wilcox spent parts of two seasons with the Vancouver Canucks in the 1970s.

He played for the hometown Royals of the British Columbia Hockey League in 1967–69 before spending three years at the University of British Columbia, where he played for the UBC Thunderbirds. Following his tenure with the Thunderbirds, Vancouver signed Wilcox as a free agent. Wilcox scored 17 goals as a rookie in 1971–72 with the Rochester Americans of the minor pro American Hockey League. The following season, he played 31 NHL games for the Canucks as an injury replacement before he was sent down to the Canucks' farm team Seattle Totems in the Western Hockey League (WHL). Wilcox spent most of the next three years in the WHL and Central Hockey League before retiring in 1976.

Post-playing career
After retiring from hockey Wilcox became a secondary school counsellor in Surrey, British Columbia.

In 1973, Barry was part of a Canucks promotional tour of the BC interior, along with Jim Robson and Ken Caravetta.  During the trip, Barry signed autographs in every Super-Valu in the region.

Career statistics

Regular season and playoffs

External links

1948 births
Living people
Canadian ice hockey forwards
Ice hockey people from British Columbia
Rochester Americans players
Seattle Totems (CHL) players
Seattle Totems (WHL) players
Sportspeople from New Westminster
Tulsa Oilers (1964–1984) players
Undrafted National Hockey League players
University of British Columbia alumni
Vancouver Canucks players